Tilpat is a census town in Faridabad district in the Indian state of Haryana that comes under the Capital Region. It is famous for the revolt against Mughals. It also has the Tilpat 1 & 2 ranges of Indian Air Force on the banks of Yamuna. Tilpat is the largest village of Brahmins in Ballabgarh district. Brahmins are the majority and the largest zamidars (most lands belong to them) other castes like Jats , Gujjars are sprinkled minority.

Demographics
 India census, Tilpat had a population of 6377. Males constitute 55% of the population and females 45%. Tilpat has an average literacy rate of 65%, higher than the national average of 59.5%: male literacy is 75%, and female literacy is 53%. In Tilpat, 18% of the population is under 6 years of age.

History
It was one of the five villages demanded by Pandavas for the sake of peace and to avert a disastrous war, Krishna proposed that if Hastinapur agrees to give the Pandavas only five villages named Indraprastha (Delhi), Swarnprastha (Sonipat), Panprastha (Panipat), Vyaghrprastha (Baghpat) and Tilprastha (Tilpat) if these five villages was given to pandavas then they would be satisfied and would make no more demands. Duryodhana vehemently refused, commenting that he would not part even with land as much as the point of a needle. Thus the stage was set for the great war, for which the epic of Mahabharata is known most of all.

Tilpat is listed in the Ain-i-Akbari as a pargana under Delhi sarkar, producing a revenue of 3,077,913 dams for the imperial treasury and supplying a force of 400 infantry and 40 cavalry. It had a brick fort at the time which was also mentioned and was held by Brahmins, Rajputs and Gujars.

At the time of the Mughal emperor Aurangzeb in the year 1600, Tilpat was called Tilpat Garhi.

Issues
In May 2018, Delhi High Court asked the government to ensure to protect the Tilpat 1 & 2 ranges of IAF on the banks of Yamuna river from the illegal sand mining.

References

Cities and towns in Faridabad district
Faridabad